The 2016 season for the  cycling team began in February with the Vuelta a Murcia. The team participated in UCI Europe Tour races and UCI World Tour events when given a wildcard invitation..

Team roster

Riders who joined the team for the 2016 season

Season victories

References

2016 road cycling season by team
2016 in Polish sport